This is a list of cricketers who have played matches for the Abbottabad cricket team.

 Asad Afridi
 Fawad Ahmed
 Sohail Akhtar
 Ashraf Ali
 Asif Ali
 Hammad Ali
 Sajjad Ali
 Wajid Ali
 Noor-ul-Amin
 Mir Azam
 Mohammad Bilal
 Armaghan Elahi
 Zafar Jadoon
 Nasir Jalil
 Riaz Kail
 Khalilullah
 Arshad Khan
 Dilawar Khan
 Fawad Khan
 Junaid Khan
 Usman Khan
 Rashid Mansoor
 Ghulam Mohammad
 Mohammad Naeem
 Ali Naqvi
 Adnan Raees
 Shakeel-ur-Rehman
 Ahmed Said
 Sajid Shah
 Yasir Shah
 Mohammad Siddiq
 Khalid Usman
 Amjad Waqas
 Yasir Hameed

References 

Lists of Pakistani cricketers